This is a list of Marathi (Indian Marathi-language) films that were released in 2018.

January – March

April–June

July – September

October – December

References
2018 Marathi Movies List

2018
Marathi
2018 in Indian cinema